Edward Laning (1906–1981) was an American painter.

Career

Background
Laning was born in 1906 in Petersburg, Illinois.

He studied at the Art Institute of Chicago (1923–1924) and the University of Chicago, (1925–1927). He also studied at the Art Students League with Max Weber, Boardman Robinson, John Sloan and Kenneth Hayes Miller (1927–1930).

Paintings, murals

In 1931, Laning's work formed part of the first major show at the newly formed Whitney Museum of American Art.  He painted murals for the Works Progress Administration during the Great Depression as well as a post office mural in Rockingham, North Carolina (1937).   In 1935, he painted the Ellis Island murals (chosen over Japanese-American artist Hideo Noda):  It was a great relief to PWA, to the College Art Association, to Architects Harvey Wiley Corbett and Chester Holmes Aldrich and to Edward Laning last week to learn that Commissioner of Immigration & Naturalization Rudolph Reimer at Ellis Island had finally approved Artist Laning's designs for murals for the dining hall at New York's immigrant station. Cheered, Muralist Laning and his two assistants, James Rutledge and Albert Soroka, hustled to get his cartoons on tempera and gesso panels as soon as possible.  In 1937, he painted murals in the New York Public Library, including his most famous work, The Story of the Recorded Word.

In 1980, Laning came to Ogden, Utah, to personally oversee the installation of his two 50-foot by 12-foot murals in the Grand Lobby of the historic Ogden Railway Station. The northern side depicts the Union Pacific company coming from Omaha, Nebraska, and the southern side depicts the Central Pacific coming from Sacramento, California.  The National Academy of Design of New York City granted $100,000 to Union Station as his commission.

Teaching
Laning taught art at the Art Students League (1932–33, 1945–50, 1952), and the Kansas City Art Institute.

He was a member of the American Society of Painters, Sculptors and Gravers and the National Academy of Design.  He served as president of the National Society of Mural Painters from 1970 to 1974.

Death

Laning died in 1981 in New York, survived by his wife, artist Mary Fife Laning.

Works

In assessing his works, the Smithsonian Institution writes:  In his work, Laning expressed his disenchantment with the political and social uncertainties of post-Depression America and his perception of the degradation of American values; in several paintings he used fire as a symbol of impending societal destruction.  Laning's works have been displayed at the Art Institute of Chicago (1945), the Carnegie Institute (1945), and the Virginia Museum of Fine Arts (1944–45).

His works can be viewed at the Metropolitan Museum of Art, the Whitney Museum of American Art, and the Richmond Professional Institute.

In addition, his works can be seen at the New York Public Library and U.S. post offices in Rockingham, North Carolina and Bowling Green, Kentucky.

Art
 Fourteenth Street (1931)
 1929 Crash (1929?)
 Pantheon (1937)
 New York Public Library murals (1937):
 The Story of the Recorded Word
 Learning to Read
 History of the Written Word
 The Role of the Immigrant in the Industrial Development of American (1937)
 The Past as Connecting Threads in Human Life, triptych, USPO, Rockingham, North Carolina (1937) 
 The Escape 
 Coney Island Beach Scene (1938)
 Prometheus (1942)
 Armor in Alaska (1943)
 Kiska Raid (1943)
 Florence August 1944 (1944)
 Saturday Afternoon at Sportsmans Park
 The Building (c. 1955)
 Union Pacific (north side mural at Union Station) (1980)
 Central Pacific (south side mural at Union Station) (1980)

Writings
 Perspective for Artists (1967)
 The Act of Drawing (1971)
 The Sketch Books of Reginald Marsh

Editing
 Sketchbooks of Reginald Marsh, compiled by Edward Laning (1973)

Illustrations
 Hello, the Boat! by Phyllis Crawford with pictures by Edward Laning (1938)

References

Sources

External links

 Smithsonian Institution:  Edward Laning papers, 1880-1983

1906 births
1981 deaths
University of Chicago alumni
Art Students League of New York alumni
20th-century American painters
American male painters
American muralists
People from Petersburg, Illinois
Painters from Illinois
Federal Art Project artists
School of the Art Institute of Chicago alumni
Art Students League of New York faculty
Kansas City Art Institute faculty
National Academy of Design members
Section of Painting and Sculpture artists
20th-century American male artists